Den 11. time (styled as "den 11. time"; English: The eleventh hour) was a Danish television talk show on DR2. It aired at 23:00 on DR2 weekly on Monday, Tuesday and Wednesday.  The show was hosted by Mikael Bertelsen, and his editor, Mads Brügger would occasionally step in as host for a given programme.

Den 11. time included guests such as the then-Danish Minister of Culture, Brian Mikkelsen, but also had foreign guests such as Phillip Blond or even Mikhail Gorbachev, who stated in a letter to the presenters that it was one of the most interesting interviews he ever did.  Sometimes the programme would air live, but other times it would be pre-recorded, often to be able to get the subtitles on for non-Danish guests.  Though, at times an interpreter in the studio provided the translations.

It last broadcast on 21 May 2008, despite large popularity.

Guests
Selected guests include (see Danish Wikipedia for dates):

 Bjarke Ingels (architect)
 Olafur Eliasson (artist)
 Jesse Jane (porn actress)
 David Lynch (movie director, transcendental meditation practitioner)
 Leif Ove Andsnes (Norwegian pianist)
 Per Arnoldi (artist)
 Anker Jørgensen (former Danish prime minister)
 Mike Sheridan (DJ, born 1991) vs Else Marie Pade (electronic music composer, born 1924)
 Erwin Neutzsky-Wulff (author, born 1949)
 Bryan Ferry (English new wave musician)
 Nicolas Winding Refn (movie director, eight appearances on the show)
 Naja Marie Aidt (poet)
 Geert Wilders (Dutch politician)
 Lars Norén (Swedish playwright, born 1944)
 Jesper Christensen (actor, born 1948)
 Klaus Rifbjerg (author, born 1931)
 Ole Christian Madsen (movie director, script writer)
 Helle Helle (author)
 May Andersen (model)
 Per Nørgård (composer, born 1932)
 Hilary Hahn (American violinist)
 Tomas Espedal (Norwegian writer)
 Gry Bay (actress)

 Hiroshi Ishiguro (Japanese engineer)
 Betty Dodson (American sex educator)

References

2008 Danish television series endings
2007 Danish television series debuts
2000s Danish television series
Danish-language television shows
DR TV original programming